Haji Malik Muhammad Waheed is a Pakistani politician who had been a member of the Provincial Assembly of the Punjab since August 2018 till January 2023. Previously, he was a Member of the Provincial Assembly of the Punjab from May 2013 to May 2018.

Early life and education
He was born on 1 August 1972 in Lahore.

He has received intermediate level education.

Political career

He was elected to the Provincial Assembly of the Punjab as a candidate of Pakistan Muslim League (Nawaz) (PML-N) from Constituency PP-146 (Lahore-X) in 2013 Pakistani general election.

He was re-elected to Provincial Assembly of the Punjab as a candidate of PML-N from Constituency PP-156 (Lahore-XIII) in 2018 Pakistani general election.

References

Living people
Punjab MPAs 2013–2018
1972 births
Pakistan Muslim League (N) MPAs (Punjab)
Punjab MPAs 2018–2023